Russian in Ukraine may refer to:

 Russian language in Ukraine
 Russians in Ukraine

See also 
 Famous Ukrainians of Russian ethnicity
 Demographics of Ukraine
 Anti-Russian sentiment in Ukraine
 Ukrainians in Russia
 Ukrainization
 Polish minority in Ukraine

Society of Ukraine